Abdulaziz Mohammed Al Anberi (born 16 September 1977) is a retired Emirati footballer who played as a midfielder, and the current manager of Emirati club Khor Fakkan fc .

Managerial statistics

Honours

Player
Sharjah
UAE League: (2)
 Champion: 1993–94, 1995–96

UAE President Cup: (3)
 Champion: 1994–95, 1997–98, 2002–03

Internationals
AFC Asian Cup: Runner-up 1996

Manager
Sharjah
UAE Pro-League: 2018–19
UAE Super Cup: 2019

References

External links
UAE FA
Kooora

Living people
Emirati footballers
United Arab Emirates international footballers
Association football midfielders
2004 AFC Asian Cup players
Sharjah FC players
UAE First Division League players
UAE Pro League players
UAE Pro League managers
Emirati football managers
1977 births